Tantonan is a rural locality in the central south part of the Riverina, New South Wales, Australia. It is situated by road, about 8 kilometres north west from Caldwell and 13 kilometres south east from Bunnaloo.

Tantonan Post Office opened on 21 June 1926 and closed in 1962.

Local education is provided by the Bunnaloo Public School.

References

Towns in the Riverina
Murray River Council